The National Print Run Service is an independent Moscow-based nonprofit organization oversighting print runs and distribution of periodicals in Russia. The service was established in August 1998 by the Russian Chamber of Commerce and Industry, Union of Journalists of Russia and five other organizations. The National Print Run Service maintains the black list of print run fraudsters (publishers and publications who exaggerate their actual print run figures).

References

External links
Official website (in Russian)

1998 establishments in Russia
Non-profit organizations based in Russia
Publishing organizations
Product-testing organizations